Several hospitals are called Valley Hospital:

United States
Valley Hospital, a former hospital in Palmer, Alaska, replaced by Mat-Su Regional Medical Center
Valley Hospital, Phoenix, Arizona
Carson Valley Hospital, Gardnerville, Nevada
Valley Hospital Medical Center, Las Vegas, Nevada
The Valley Hospital, Ridgewood, New Jersey
Valley Hospital (Klamath Falls, Oregon), listed on the National Register of Historic Places
Valley Hospital and Medical Center, Spokane Valley, Washington

See also
 Valley Medical Center (disambiguation)